100Stone, also known as the 100 Stone project, is a public installation art project in Alaska. It depicts "personal struggles with mental health, told in sculptural form". Sarah Davies leads the project which also includes Ed Mighell (clay artist), Brian Hutton (community activist), Catherine Shenk (landscape designer; horticulturist), and Lee Holmes (engineer).

History
The project began in summer 2013 and the installation occurred November 2015. By the time of the dedication, 9 December 2015, there were 68 sculptures of humans placed along the coast of Anchorage, Alaska at Point Woronzof Overlook on Northern Lights Boulevard. The figures are created using plaster-covered burlap casts of individuals, plus cement and straw, as well as mannequin parts, such as arms.

Many of the sculptures were damaged by the tides, weather and vandals. The sculptures will be removed from Point Woronzof in April, 2016.

References

External links

 

2015 in Alaska
2016 disestablishments in Alaska
2015 sculptures
Culture of Anchorage, Alaska
Outdoor sculptures in Alaska
Sculptures of men in the United States
Sculptures of women in the United States
Vandalized works of art in Alaska